Zaránd County was an administrative unit of the Kingdom of Hungary and the Principality of Transylvania from the middle ages until 1876. Located mainly in the Fehér-Körös/Crișul Alb river valley, today its former territory lies mostly in Romania, with a small amount in south-eastern Hungary.

In the 16th century Zaránd was part of the Eastern Hungarian Kingdom and later the Partium territories of the Principality of Transylvania. It returned to Habsburg Hungary in 1699.

In 1744 most of the western territory of Zaránd County, including its capital Zaránd/Zărand, was transferred to Arad County; Körösbánya/Baia de Criș became the capital of the new rump county.

In 1854 the  system was revised significantly with the previously five  becoming ten; Zaránd's territory became part of the new  of Broos. The pre-1848 counties, including Zaránd, were restored in 1860.

Zaránd county was finally permanently dissolved as part of the 1876 administrative reform in the Lands of the Crown of Saint Stephen; most of its territory became part of Hunyad County as the Körösbánya and Brád districts, with a smaller western part being merged into Arad county as the district of Nagyhalmágy.

List of ispáns

Middle Ages

Notes

Sources 

Counties in the Kingdom of Hungary
Banat
Crișana